Grainne Maire Leahy  O'Brien (born 2 August 1966 in Dublin) is an Irish international cricketer who debuted for the Ireland national side in 1997. A top order batter, she played 11 One Day International matches.

References

1966 births
Irish women cricketers
Living people
Ireland women One Day International cricketers
Cricketers from Dublin (city)